Whispering Death may refer to
Bristol Beaufighter, an aircraft of World War II nicknamed "whispering death"
The Whispering Death, a novel by Daniel Carney
Albino (film), also known as Whispering Death, a 1976 German thriller 
Whispering Death, a novel by Garry Disher 
Michael Holding (born 1954), a West Indian cricketer nicknamed "Whispering Death"
Victorian Railways L class, known as "The Whispering Death", an electric railway engine
M1 Abrams, nicknamed "whispering death", a tank of the United States Army
Whispering death from How To Train Your Dragon, its a boulder class.

See also
"Whistling Death", a name applied to the Vought F4U Corsair fighter of World War II